Noa Seru Nakaitaci (born 11 July 1990) is a Fiji-born rugby union player who plays for the France national rugby union team. His position is wing and he currently plays for Lyon OU in the Top 14.

He began his career in Fiji before moving to Clermont in 2011. He was selected to play for France in 2013 against the All Blacks.

Noa was raised in Lautoka and in 2009, he was picked by the Lautoka Rugby coach to join Lautoka from the Lautoka under-23 team and into the main team. He also captained the Fiji Schoolboys to Samoa for the FORU championships that year where they won, beating the hosts Samoa. He played for Lautoka for a short while before getting a contract to play in France.

References

1990 births
Living people
Fijian rugby union players
ASM Clermont Auvergne players
Lyon OU players
Rugby union wings
Fijian expatriate rugby union players
Expatriate rugby union players in France
Fijian expatriate sportspeople in France
Sportspeople from Lautoka
I-Taukei Fijian people
People educated at Ratu Kadavulevu School
France international rugby union players